Sanford station is a railroad terminal in Sanford, Florida. It is the southern terminus for Amtrak's Auto Train, which runs between this station and Lorton, Virginia.

As of 2022, the Auto Train loads its passengers on two tracks in Sanford, as no single track is long enough for all of the passenger railcars. A railroad crossing runs through the middle of Sanford's rail yard, an unusual situation for a modern station and yard.

History 
The station was opened in 1971 by the Auto-Train Corporation, a railroad that operated its rolling stock along tracks owned by other railroads. The station and the service closed when the railroad fell into bankruptcy in 1981.

The station was reopened in 1983 when Amtrak revived the Auto Train service. In 2004, the station building was damaged by hurricanes. The facility was also older and smaller than the terminal at Lorton.

On May 18, 2009, Amtrak broke ground on a new $10.5 million station designed by d+A design + Architecture of Yardley, Pennsylvania. The new building, opened on October 18, 2010, has a waiting room for 600 travelers, ticket counter, café, restrooms, and a gift shop. The building incorporates energy-saving features such as energy-efficient HVAC, lighting, and glass coatings that minimize solar gain. A portion of the old station abutting the new structure was reconfigured into administrative offices.

Other train stations in Sanford 
A second Amtrak station was located three-tenths of a mile south of the Auto Train terminal, which served the Silver Star, Silver Meteor, and Sunset Limited. The station was built by the Atlantic Coast Line Railroad in 1913 and rebuilt in 1953. Like most U.S. passenger stations, it was acquired by Amtrak upon its inception in 1971. Amtrak closed the station on August 1, 2005, and demolished it in 2009.

SunRail, the Central Florida commuter rail system, revived local passenger rail service to Sanford when it began operations in 2014. It built a new station on State Road 46 rather than on the site of the former Amtrak station.

References

External links 

 Detailed station and Auto Train info
 Sanford Amtrak-Auto Train Station (USA Rail Guide -- TrainWeb)
Original Sanford Terminal images (Theme Trains.com)

Amtrak stations in Florida
Auto Train
Railway stations in the United States opened in 1971
Transportation buildings and structures in Seminole County, Florida
1971 establishments in Florida